The 1934–35 international cricket season was from September 1934 to April 1935. The season consists one international tour.

Season overview

January

England in the West Indies

References

International cricket competitions by season
1934 in cricket
1935 in cricket